Engineer (foaled c. 1756) was a brown English Thoroughbred stallion bred by William Fenton of Glass House, near Leeds, Yorkshire. His outstanding son was Mambrino, although he sired some good race horses, such as King's Plate winner Fireworker, and Black Tom, a number of his daughters gained distinction as broodmares.

Pedigree

References

External links
Profile at Bloodlines.net

Racehorses bred in the United Kingdom
1750s racehorse births